Strondafjorden is a lake which lies in the municipalities of Nord-Aurdal and Vestre Slidre in Innlandet county, Norway. The lake is part of the Begna watershed. The town of Fagernes is located at the southeast end of the lake.

The northwest end of the lake is crossed by the Ulnes Bridge in the village of Røn. The European route E16 highway runs along the north shore of the lake, for its whole length. The Strondafjorden is a reservoir for the Faslefoss hydroelectric power plant. In 1919, a dam was built at the south end of the lake to regulate the lake for power production.

See also
List of lakes in Norway

References

Vestre Slidre
Nord-Aurdal
Lakes of Innlandet